Weddell's saddle-back tamarin (Leontocebus weddelli) is a species of saddle-back tamarin, a type of small monkey from South America.  Weddell's saddle-back tamarin was formerly considered to be a subspecies of the brown-mantled tamarin, L. fuscicollis.  It lives in Brazil, Bolivia and Peru, with the type locality being in Bolivia.

There are 3 subspecies:
Leontocebus weddelli weddelli
Crandall's saddle-back tamarin, (Leontocebus weddelli crandalli)
White-mantled tamarin or White saddle-back tamarin, (Leontocebus weddelli melanoleucus)

Its diet consists of fruits, gums, nectar, insects and other small animals.  It lives in various types of groups, including single-adult male, single adult female groups, multi-male, multi-female groups, single-male, multi-female groups and single female, multi male groups.  Females sometimes remain in their natal group. It associates with the emperor tamarin, the red-bellied tamarin and Goeldi's marmoset.

The IUCN rates it as least concern from a conservation standpoint.

References

Leontocebus
Taxa named by Émile Deville
Mammals described in 1849